João Carlos Reiners Terron (born 9 February 1968), writing as Joca Reiners Terron, is a Brazilian poet, novelist, designer and editor.

Biography 
Terron was born in Cuiabá, in 1968. He studied Architecture at UFRJ and studied Industrial Design at UNESP. He lives in São Paulo since 1995.

He was founder and editor of the independent publishing house Ciência do Acidente. His works appeared on several anthologies published in Brazil and abroad, such as Geração 90: os transgressores (Boitempo, 2003), Os Cem Menores Contos Brasileiros do Século (Ateliê Editorial, 2004), Dentro de um livro (Casa da Palavra, 2005), A Literatura latino-americana do século XXI (Aeroplano Editora/Centro Cultural Banco do Brasil, 2005), Contos Cruéis: as narrativas mais violentas da literatura brasileira contemporânea (Geração Editorial, 2006), Rattapalax and  McSweeneys 46: The Latin American Crime Issue (2014)

Works

Novels 
 Não há nada lá (Ciência do Acidente, 2001; Companhia das Letras, 2011)
 Curva de Rio Sujo (Planeta, 2004) (adapted into film by Felipe Bragança)
 Do fundo do poço se vê a lua (Companhia das Letras, 2010)
 Guia de ruas sem saída – Bolsa Petrobrás de fomento à Criação Literária. Illustrations by André Ducci, (selo editorial Edith, 2012)
 A tristeza extraordinária do Leopardo-das-Neves (Companhia das Letras, 2013)
 Noite Dentro da Noite (Companhia das Letras, 2017)
 A Morte e o Meteoro (Companhia das Letras, 2019)
 O Riso dos Ratos (Todavia, 2021)

Short stories 
 Hotel Hell (Livros do Mal, 2003)
 Sonho interrompido por guilhotina (Casa da Palavra, 2006)

Poetry 
 Eletroencefalodrama (Ciência do Acidente, 1998)
 Animal anônimo (Ciência do Acidente, 2002)
 Transportuñol borracho (Yiyi Jambo, Asunción, 2008)

Stage plays 
 Cedo ou tarde tudo morre – dirigida por Haroldo Rego e encenada no projeto Nova Dramaturgia Brasileira (CCBB Brasília – maio/2011).
 Bom Retiro 958 Metros – com Teatro da Vertigem, direção de Antônio Araújo, encenada em São Paulo entre junho de 2012 e abril de 2013.}

Awards 
 Prêmio Redescoberta da Literatura Brasileira da Revista Cult por "Não Há Nada Lá" (2000).
 Bolsa para autores com obra em conclusão da Fundação Biblioteca Nacional (2002).
 Bolsa Petrobras de Criação Literária por "Guia de Ruas Sem Saída" (2007).
 Prêmio Machado de Assis de Romance da Fundação Biblioteca Nacional por Do fundo do poço se vê a lua (Companhia das Letras, 2010).
 Menção Honrosa na categoria Contos por "A Memória é uma Curva de Rio Sujo" – Concurso Nacional de Literatura Cidade de Belo Horizonte.

References

External links 
 http://www.mertin-litag.de/authors_htm/Terron-J.htm Profile atMertin Literary Agency
 Terron, Joca Enciclopédia Itaú Cultural da Literatura Brasileira
 Author's Blog

1968 births
Brazilian male poets
People from Cuiabá
Living people
Brazilian male dramatists and playwrights
Brazilian male novelists
Brazilian male short story writers
20th-century Brazilian poets
20th-century Brazilian male writers
21st-century Brazilian dramatists and playwrights
21st-century Brazilian novelists
21st-century Brazilian short story writers
21st-century Brazilian poets
21st-century Brazilian male writers